Community Justice Scotland is an executive non-departmental public body of the Scottish Government, which is responsible for reducing reoffending. It launched in April 2017.

It was established by the Community Justice (Scotland) Act 2016, replacing eight community justice authorities that were set up under the Management of Offenders etc (Scotland) Act 2005.

The organisation will oversee the new local arrangements, which aims to provide a more effectively rehabilitation in the community, following convictions. As well as having a role in assisting people released from custody, it will also be concerned with the management of people convicted of crimes who are not sent to prison.

Karyn McCluskey, who had been Director of the Violence Reduction Unit, was named chief executive in September 2016. Jean Couper was the initial chair. Lindsay Montgomery took over as chair from 13 May 2019.

References

External sources
 

2017 establishments in Scotland
Government agencies established in 2017
Organisations based in Edinburgh
Executive non-departmental public bodies of the Scottish Government
Legal organisations based in Scotland